The Control Commission of the Workers' Party of Korea() was a control organ established at the 1st WPNK Congress in 1946 and abolished at the 8th WPK Congress in 2021. According to the party rules it was responsible for investigating if party members breached party rules and policies. Party members who breached either rules or contravened the policies of the party could be judged as anti-party counterrevolution figures by the Inspection Commission.

In 2021 its duties and responsibilities was transferred to the Central Auditing Commission.

Chairmen

 Kim Yong-bom (1946–47) – of Workers' Party of North Korea as part of the 1st Central Inspection Commission of the Workers' Party of North Korea
 Choe Won-taek (1946–49) – of Workers' Party of South Korea
 Chang Sun-myong (1948–53)
 Kim Ung-gi (1953–56)
 Kim Ik-son (1956–70)
 Kim Yo-jung ((1970–80)
 So Chol (1980–92)
 Jon Mun-sop (1992–98)
 Pak Yong-sok (1999–07)
 Ru Tuk-nam (2007–10) 
 Kim Kuk-thae (2010–13)
 Hong In-bom (2016–17)
 Jo Yon-jun (2016–17)
 Ri Sang-won (2017–21)

References

Footnotes

Bibliography

 

Central Committee of the Workers' Party of Korea